The Food of the Gods may refer to:

 Food of the gods (mythology), a substance in Greek mythology
 Food of the gods (plant), a species of Ferula native to Iran
 Food of the Gods (book), a non-fiction book by Terence McKenna
 "The Food of the Gods" (short story), a science fiction short story by Arthur C. Clarke
 The Food of the Gods and How It Came to Earth, a British science fiction novel by H.G. Wells
 The Food of the Gods (film), a 1976 giant monster film loosely based on the Wells novel.
 Food of the Gods II, the 1976 film's 1989 sequel

See also

 Food for the Gods